Simon Picone (born 26 September 1982) is an Italian rugby union player for Benetton Treviso in the Pro14 competition. He was born in Viterbo.

A Scrum-half, Picone was called up to the Italy squad for the 2008 Six Nations Championship. He came off the bench in Italy's 23–19 defeat to England in Rome to run in a try after charging down debutant England fly-half Danny Cipriani's kick.

References

External links
RBS 6 Nations profile

1982 births
Living people
Italian rugby union players
Sportspeople from Rome
Rugby Roma Olimpic players
Italy international rugby union players
L'Aquila Rugby players
Rugby union scrum-halves